Oshwill Nortjé (born 3 December 1990) is a South African professional rugby union player, currently playing with the . His regular position is scrum-half.

Career

Youth

Nortjé grew up in George, but then enrolled at the Harmony Sports Academy in Virginia, Free State. His performances for them led to his inclusion in the  youth sides that played at the Under-18 Academy Week in 2007 and at the Under-18 Craven Week in 2008.

Also in 2008, Nortjé was included in the  side that played in the Under-19 Provincial Championship. He also played in the same competition in 2009 and in the Under-21 Provincial Championships in 2010 and 2011.

Griffons

During the 2010 Vodacom Cup, he was included in the first team squad for the first time and was named on the bench for their match against . However, he failed to make an appearance during that game and had to wait almost a year to get another opportunity to make his debut. He promptly ran onto the field in the 67th minute of the match for his first class debut and soon celebrated scoring his first try, dotting down in the 74th minute. He made a further two appearances during the competition, but failed to make the breakthrough to their Currie Cup side.

Nortjé was the first-choice scrum-half for the Griffons during the 2014 Vodacom Cup competition, starting six of their matches and was also included in their squad for the 2014 Currie Cup qualification tournament.

References

South African rugby union players
Living people
1990 births
People from George, South Africa
Rugby union scrum-halves
Griffons (rugby union) players
Rugby union players from the Western Cape